Otín can refer to:

 Otín (Jihlava District), Czech Republic
 Otín (Žďár nad Sázavou District), Czech Republic

See also
 Otin, female Islamic teachers in Central Asia
 Otin River, river in Nigeria